Giovane Alves da Silva (born 25 November 1982 in Taió, Santa Catarina, Brazil), commonly known as Giovane or 基奧雲尼 in Hong Kong and 思华 in mainland China, is a former Brazilian-born Hong Kong professional footballer who played as a striker.

Club career
Giovane joined Sun Hei in 2007. He came to prominence the season after and bested fellow Brazilian Detinho to become the top scorer of that season with 26 goals. He became considered one of the best foreign players of the league after this achievement. He left the club to try pursuing a career in Europe but failed to land a contract, joining Brazilian clubs Brusque and Atlético Ibirama. In 2010, he joined Guangdong Sunray Cave, scoring 12 goals in 23 games. In December 2010 he returned to Hong Kong joining South China, scoring in his debut against Tuen Mun resulting in a 4–1 victory for his side. In 2012, he joined Biu Chun Rangers enjoying a fruitful spell. However, he was not kept as the club thinks he does not suit their playing style.

In 2013, he joined Eastern and led the club in scoring for each of his four seasons at the club.

On 27 June 2017, R&F vice chairman Huang Shenghua announced that his club had signed Giovane on a free transfer. On 14 October 2020, he left the club after his club's withdrawal from the HKPL in the new season.

International career
Giovane received his Hong Kong passport in September 2018 and was called into manager Gary White's preliminary squad on 26 September 2018. On 11 October 2018, Giovane made his debut for the national team against Thailand.

Career statistics

Club
As of October 31, 2010

International

Honours
South China
 Hong Kong FA Cup: 2010–11
 Hong Kong League Cup: 2010–11

Eastern
 Hong Kong Premier League: 2015–16
 Hong Kong Senior Shield: 2014–15, 2015–16
 Hong Kong FA Cup: 2013–14

Individual
Hong Kong Footballer of the Year: 2015

References

External links
 

1982 births
Living people
Hong Kong footballers
Hong Kong international footballers
Brazilian footballers
Brazilian emigrants to Hong Kong
Association football forwards
Clube Náutico Marcílio Dias players
Brusque Futebol Clube players
Sun Hei SC players
Guangdong Sunray Cave players
China League One players
Hong Kong First Division League players
Hong Kong Premier League players
Expatriate footballers in China
Brazilian expatriate sportspeople in China
Eastern Sports Club footballers
Hong Kong Rangers FC players
R&F (Hong Kong) players
Hong Kong League XI representative players